Städtischer Friedhof III is a cemetery in the Friedenau district of the borough of Tempelhof-Schöneberg in Berlin, Germany. Buried here are  Ferruccio Busoni (1866–1924), Marlene Dietrich (1901–1992) and Helmut Newton (1920–2004).

References

External links

 

Cemeteries in Berlin
Buildings and structures in Tempelhof-Schöneberg